Selenium (34Se) has six natural isotopes that occur in significant quantities, along with the trace isotope 79Se, which occurs in minute quantities in uranium ores. Five of these isotopes are stable: 74Se, 76Se, 77Se, 78Se, and 80Se. The last three also occur as fission products, along with 79Se, which has a half-life of 327,000 years, and 82Se, which has a very long half-life (~1020 years, decaying via double beta decay to 82Kr) and for practical purposes can be considered to be stable. There are 23 other unstable isotopes that have been characterized, the longest-lived being 79Se with a half-life 327,000 years, 75Se with a half-life of 120 days, and 72Se with a half-life of 8.40 days. Of the other isotopes, 73Se has the longest half-life, 7.15 hours; most others have half-lives not exceeding 38 seconds.

List of isotopes 

|-
| rowspan=2|65Se
| rowspan=2 style="text-align:right" | 34
| rowspan=2 style="text-align:right" | 31
| rowspan=2|64.96466(64)#
| rowspan=2|<50 ms
| β+ (>99.9%)
| 65As
| rowspan=2|3/2−#
| rowspan=2|
| rowspan=2|
|-
| β+, p (<.1%)
| 64Ge
|-
| 66Se
| style="text-align:right" | 34
| style="text-align:right" | 32
| 65.95521(32)#
| 33(12) ms
| β+
| 66As
| 0+
|
|
|-
| rowspan=2|67Se
| rowspan=2 style="text-align:right" | 34
| rowspan=2 style="text-align:right" | 33
| rowspan=2|66.95009(21)#
| rowspan=2|133(11) ms
| β+ (99.5%)
| 67As
| rowspan=2|5/2−#
| rowspan=2|
| rowspan=2|
|-
| β+, p (.5%)
| 66Ge
|-
| 68Se
| style="text-align:right" | 34
| style="text-align:right" | 34
| 67.94180(4)
| 35.5(7) s
| β+
| 68As
| 0+
|
|
|-
| rowspan=2|69Se
| rowspan=2 style="text-align:right" | 34
| rowspan=2 style="text-align:right" | 35
| rowspan=2|68.93956(4)
| rowspan=2|27.4(2) s
| β+ (99.955%)
| 69As
| rowspan=2|(1/2−)
| rowspan=2|
| rowspan=2|
|-
| β+, p (.045%)
| 68Ge
|-
| style="text-indent:1em" | 69m1Se
| colspan="3" style="text-indent:2em" | 39.4(1) keV
| 2.0(2) μs
|
|
| 5/2−
|
|
|-
| style="text-indent:1em" | 69m2Se
| colspan="3" style="text-indent:2em" | 573.9(10) keV
| 955(16) ns
|
|
| 9/2+
|
|
|-
| 70Se
| style="text-align:right" | 34
| style="text-align:right" | 36
| 69.93339(7)
| 41.1(3) min
| β+
| 70As
| 0+
|
|
|-
| 71Se
| style="text-align:right" | 34
| style="text-align:right" | 37
| 70.93224(3)
| 4.74(5) min
| β+
| 71As
| 5/2−
|
|
|-
| style="text-indent:1em" | 71m1Se
| colspan="3" style="text-indent:2em" | 48.79(5) keV
| 5.6(7) μs
|
|
| 1/2− to 9/2−
|
|
|-
| style="text-indent:1em" | 71m2Se
| colspan="3" style="text-indent:2em" | 260.48(10) keV
| 19.0(5) μs
|
|
| (9/2)+
|
|
|-
| 72Se
| style="text-align:right" | 34
| style="text-align:right" | 38
| 71.927112(13)
| 8.40(8) d
| EC
| 72As
| 0+
|
|
|-
| 73Se
| style="text-align:right" | 34
| style="text-align:right" | 39
| 72.926765(11)
| 7.15(8) h
| β+
| 73As
| 9/2+
|
|
|-
| rowspan=2 style="text-indent:1em" | 73mSe
| rowspan=2 colspan="3" style="text-indent:2em" | 25.71(4) keV
| rowspan=2|39.8(13) min
| IT
| 73Se
| rowspan=2|3/2−
| rowspan=2|
| rowspan=2|
|-
| β+
| 73As
|-
| 74Se
| style="text-align:right" | 34
| style="text-align:right" | 40
| 73.9224764(18)
| colspan=3 align=center|Observationally Stable
| 0+
| 0.0089(4)
|
|-
| 75Se
| style="text-align:right" | 34
| style="text-align:right" | 41
| 74.9225234(18)
| 119.779(4) d
| EC
| 75As
| 5/2+
|
|
|-
| 76Se
| style="text-align:right" | 34
| style="text-align:right" | 42
| 75.9192136(18)
| colspan=3 align=center|Stable
| 0+
| 0.0937(29)
|
|-
| 77Se
| style="text-align:right" | 34
| style="text-align:right" | 43
| 76.9199140(18)
| colspan=3 align=center|Stable
| 1/2−
| 0.0763(16)
|
|-
| style="text-indent:1em" | 77mSe
| colspan="3" style="text-indent:2em" | 161.9223(7) keV
| 17.36(5) s
| IT
| 77Se
| 7/2+
|
|
|-
| 78Se
| style="text-align:right" | 34
| style="text-align:right" | 44
| 77.9173091(18)
| colspan=3 align=center|Stable
| 0+
| 0.2377(28)
|
|-
| 79Se
| style="text-align:right" | 34
| style="text-align:right" | 45
| 78.9184991(18)
| 3.27(8)×105 y
| β−
| 79Br
| 7/2+
|
|
|-
| rowspan=2 style="text-indent:1em" | 79mSe
| rowspan=2 colspan="3" style="text-indent:2em" | 95.77(3) keV
| rowspan=2|3.92(1) min
| IT (99.944%)
| 79Se
| rowspan=2|1/2−
| rowspan=2|
| rowspan=2|
|-
| β− (.056%)
| 79Br
|- 
| 80Se
| style="text-align:right" | 34
| style="text-align:right" | 46
| 79.9165213(21)
| colspan=3 align=center|Observationally Stable
| 0+
| 0.4961(41)
|
|-
| 81Se
| style="text-align:right" | 34
| style="text-align:right" | 47
| 80.9179925(22)
| 18.45(12) min
| β−
| 81Br
| 1/2−
|
|
|-
| rowspan=2 style="text-indent:1em" | 81mSe
| rowspan=2 colspan="3" style="text-indent:2em" | 102.99(6) keV
| rowspan=2|57.28(2) min
| IT (99.948%)
| 81Se
| rowspan=2|7/2+
| rowspan=2|
| rowspan=2|
|-
| β− (.052%)
| 81Br
|-
| 82Se
| style="text-align:right" | 34
| style="text-align:right" | 48
| 81.9166994(22)
| 0.97(5)×1020 y
| β−β−
| 82Kr
| 0+
| 0.0873(22)
| 
|-
| 83Se
| style="text-align:right" | 34
| style="text-align:right" | 49
| 82.919118(4)
| 22.3(3) min
| β−
| 83Br
| 9/2+
|
|
|-
| style="text-indent:1em" | 83mSe
| colspan="3" style="text-indent:2em" | 228.50(20) keV
| 70.1(4) s
| β−
| 83Br
| 1/2−
|
|
|-
| 84Se
| style="text-align:right" | 34
| style="text-align:right" | 50
| 83.918462(16)
| 3.1(1) min
| β−
| 84Br
| 0+
|
|
|-
| 85Se
| style="text-align:right" | 34
| style="text-align:right" | 51
| 84.92225(3)
| 31.7(9) s
| β−
| 85Br
| (5/2+)#
|
|
|-
| 86Se
| style="text-align:right" | 34
| style="text-align:right" | 52
| 85.924272(17)
| 15.3(9) s
| β−
| 86Br
| 0+
|
|
|-
| rowspan=2|87Se
| rowspan=2 style="text-align:right" | 34
| rowspan=2 style="text-align:right" | 53
| rowspan=2|86.92852(4)
| rowspan=2|5.50(12) s
| β− (99.64%)
| 87Br
| rowspan=2|(5/2+)#
| rowspan=2|
| rowspan=2|
|-
| β−, n (.36%)
| 86Br
|-
| rowspan=2|88Se
| rowspan=2 style="text-align:right" | 34
| rowspan=2 style="text-align:right" | 54
| rowspan=2|87.93142(5)
| rowspan=2|1.53(6) s
| β− (99.01%)
| 88Br
| rowspan=2|0+
| rowspan=2|
| rowspan=2|
|-
| β−, n (.99%)
| 87Br
|-
| rowspan=2|89Se
| rowspan=2 style="text-align:right" | 34
| rowspan=2 style="text-align:right" | 55
| rowspan=2|88.93645(32)#
| rowspan=2|0.41(4) s
| β− (92.2%)
| 89Br
| rowspan=2|(5/2+)#
| rowspan=2|
| rowspan=2|
|-
| β−, n (7.8%)
| 88Br
|-
| rowspan=2|90Se
| rowspan=2 style="text-align:right" | 34
| rowspan=2 style="text-align:right" | 56
| rowspan=2|89.93996(43)#
| rowspan=2|300# ms [>300 ns]
| β−, n
| 89Br
| rowspan=2|0+
| rowspan=2|
| rowspan=2|
|-
| β−
| 90Br
|-
| rowspan=2|91Se
| rowspan=2 style="text-align:right" | 34
| rowspan=2 style="text-align:right" | 57
| rowspan=2|90.94596(54)#
| rowspan=2|270(50) ms
| β− (79%)
| 91Br
| rowspan=2|1/2+#
| rowspan=2|
| rowspan=2|
|-
| β−, n
| 90Br
|-
| 92Se
| style="text-align:right" | 34
| style="text-align:right" | 58
| 91.94992(64)#
| 100# ms [>300 ns]
| β−
| 92Br
| 0+
|
|
|-
| 93Se
| style="text-align:right" | 34
| style="text-align:right" | 59
| 92.95629(86)#
| 50# ms [>300 ns]
|
|
| 1/2+#
|
|
|-
| 94Se
| style="text-align:right" | 34
| style="text-align:right" | 60
| 93.96049(86)#
| 20# ms [>300 ns]
|
|
| 0+
|
|

Selenium-75
The isotope selenium-75 has radiopharmaceutical uses. For example, it is used in high-dose-rate endorectal brachytherapy, as an alternative to iridium-192.

References 

 Isotope masses from:

 Isotopic compositions and standard atomic masses from:

 Half-life, spin, and isomer data selected from the following sources.

 
Selenium
Selenium